Darjeeling Sadar subdivision is a subdivision of the Darjeeling district in the state of West Bengal, India.

Subdivisions
Darjeeling district is divided into the following administrative subdivisions:

Police stations
Police stations in the Darjeeling Sadar subdivision have the following features and jurisdiction:

.* The total length of border with Nepal (Mechi River) is 

.**The total length of border with Sikkim (Rangit, Teesta and Rangpo Rivers) is

Gram Panchayats
Gram panchayats in Darjeeling Sadar subdivision are :

 Darjeeling Pulbazar block has 23 gram panchayats, viz. Darjeeling-I, Darjeeling-II, Bijanbari-Pulbazar, Goke-I, Goke-II, Kaijalia, Nayanor, Singtam Soom, Lodhoma-I, Lodhoma-II, Relling, Chungtong, Rimbik, Rishirhat-Bloomfield, Rangit-I, Rangit-II, Lebong Valley-I, Lebong Valley-II, Dabaipani, Badamtam, Sirikhola-Daragaon, Jhepi and Mazuwa.
 Jorebunglow Sukiapokhri block has 16 gram panchayats, viz. Lower Sonada-I, Lower Sonada-II, Upper Sonada, Rangbul, Lingia Maraybong, Dhootria Kalej Valley, Munda Kothi, Rangbhang Gopaldhara, Pokhriabong-I, Pokhriabong-II, Pokhriabong-III, Permaguri Tamsang, Gorabari Margaret's Hope, Plungdung, Ghum Khasmahal, and Sukhia-Simana.
 Rangli Rangliot block consists of rural areas only with 11 gram panchayats, viz. Rangli, Takdah, Labdah, Maneydara, Tackling-I, Tackling-II, Lamahatta, Pubang-Rampuria, Singrimtam, Ressep and Rongchong.

Blocks
Community development blocks in Darjeeling Sadar subdivision are:

Demographics

According to the 2011 census, Hindus numbered 280,832 and formed 65.82% of the population. Buddhists numbered 105,058 and formed 24.47% of the population. Christians numbered 29,039 and formed 6.76% of the population. Muslims numbered 6,255 and formed 1.46% of the population. Others numbered 8,207 and formed 1.91% of the population.

Education

Educational institutions
The following institutions are located in Darjeeling Sadar subdivision:
St Joseph's College, Darjeeling, a Jesuit institution, established in 1927 at Darjeeling.
Southfield College, was founded as Loreto College in 1961, at Darjeeling.
Darjeeling Government College was established in 1948 at Darjeeling.
Salesian College was established at Sonada in 1933.
Sonada Degree College was established at Sonada in 1985.
Bijanbari Degree College was established in 1995 at Bijanbari.
Ghoom Jorebunglow College was established in 2004 at Ghum.

Overview
Given in the table below (data in numbers) is a comprehensive picture of the education scenario in Darjeeling district, with data for the year 2012-13.

Note: Primary schools include junior basic schools; middle schools, high schools and higher secondary schools include madrasahs; technical schools include junior technical schools, junior government polytechnics, industrial technical institutes, industrial training centres, nursing training institutes etc.; technical and professional colleges include engineering colleges, medical colleges, para-medical institutes, management colleges, teachers training and nursing training colleges, law colleges, art colleges, music colleges etc. Special and non-formal education centres include sishu siksha kendras, madhyamik siksha kendras, centres of Rabindra mukta vidyalaya, recognised Sanskrit tols, institutions for the blind and other handicapped persons, Anganwadi centres, reformatory schools etc.

Healthcare
The table below (all data in numbers) presents an overview of the medical facilities available and patients treated in the hospitals, health centres and sub-centres in 2013 in Darjeeling district, with data for the year 2012-13.:

.* Excluding nursing homes.

Medical facilities
Medical facilities in Darjeeling Sadar subdivision are as follows:

Hospitals: (Name, location, beds) 
Darjeeling District Hospital, Darjeeling M, 500 beds
Darjeeling Jail Hospital, Darjeeling, 12 beds
Darjeeling Maternity Hospital, Darjeeling, 50 beds
Medicinal Plantation Hospital, Mangpoo, 16 beds

Rural Hospitals: (Name, CD block, location, beds) 
Bijanbari Rural Hospital, Darjeeling Pulbazar CD block, Bijanbari, 30 beds
Takdah Rural Hospital, Rangli Rangliot CD block, Takdah, 30 beds

Block Primary Health Centres: (Name, CD block, location, beds)
Sukhiapokhri Block Primary Health Centre, Jorebunglow Sukhiapokhri CD block, Sukhiapokhri, 25 beds

Primary Health Centres : (CD block-wise)(CD block, PHC location, beds)
Darjeeling Pulbazar CD block:Lodhoma (10)
Rangli Rangliot CD block: Singringtom (10), Takling (4)
Jorebunglow Sukhiapokhri CD block: Ghum (6), Pokhriabong (2)

Legislative segments
As per order of the Delimitation Commission in respect of the delimitation of constituencies in West Bengal, the area under Darjeeling municipality, Darjeeling Pulbazar block and eleven gram panchayats under Jorebunglow Sukiapokhri block, viz. Dhootria Kalej Valley, Ghum Khasmahal, Sukhia–Simana, Rangbhang Gopaldhara, Pokhriabong–I, Pokhriabong–II, Pokhriabong–III, Lingia Maraybong,  Permaguri Tamsang, Plungdung and Rangbul constitutes the Darjeeling assembly constituency of West Bengal. The other five gram panchayats of Jorebunglow Sukiapokhri block, viz. Lower Sonada–I, Upper Sonada, Lower Sonada–II, Munda Kothi and Gorabari Margaret's Hope are part of Kurseong assembly constituency, along with the area under Rangli Rangliot block. Both assembly constituencies will be part of Darjeeling Lok Sabha constituency.

References

Subdivisions of West Bengal
Subdivisions of Darjeeling district